Arpașu de Jos is a commune located in Sibiu County, Transylvania, Romania. It is composed of three villages: Arpașu de Jos, Arpașu de Sus (Felsőárpás) and Nou Român (Oláhújfalu).

References

Communes in Sibiu County
Localities in Transylvania